This is a list of Maryland musicians, consisting of Marylanders who are musically notable, with a strong connection to the State of Maryland, USA and others who are notable within the music of Maryland. People listed may be relevant to the state of Maryland, the Province of Maryland or the area now known as Maryland before it was either a state or colony, and may be primarily relevant for reasons not related to music, so long as they do have some musical notability.

This covers specific individuals only. There is a separate list of Maryland music groups.

This list features relevant music people that are:
Covered in an academic journal article or book, provided coverage goes beyond mere listing as an example of a broader trend
Those documented as having special notability or popularity within the music field and are listed in reputably published sources.

References

Lists of American musicians